Fritz Lustig (31 March 1919 – 18 December 2017) was a German-Jewish emigrant to England during the Nazi era.

Lustig was born on 31 March 1919. he arrived in the United Kingdom in April 1939 (his parents later left Germany for Portugal; his brother, Ted, to the United States, for whom he fought during the war).

He was briefly interned as an "enemy alien", at Peveril Camp, on the Isle of Man, in 1940, following the outbreak of World War II. He then enlisted in the British Army's Pioneer Corps, playing cello in its orchestra, but was transferred to the Combined Services Detailed Interrogation Centre in 1943, where he eavesdropped on captured Axis officers at Latimer House and Wilton Park in Buckinghamshire, known then as "No 1 Distribution Centre" and "No 2 Distribution Centre" respectively.

After rising to Regimental Sergeant Major, he was demobbed in June 1946. He subsequently worked in accountancy and credit control. He obtained British nationality in May 1947.

While working for CSDIC he met Susan Cohn, also a refugee from Germany. They were married in 1945. She died in 2013. One of their two sons is the broadcaster Robin Lustig. The other is Stephen, a music publisher.

Lustig died on 18 December 2017. Several obituaries were published, including those in The Times, and The Guardian, and one on the BBC Radio 4 programme Last Word.

References

External links 
Hitler came to power 80 years ago. I remember it like yesterday - reminiscence by Lustig, in The Guardian, 30 January 2013
The M Room - BBC World Service radio programme featuring Lustig
Secret Listener - interview transcript, 2012

1919 births
2017 deaths
Musicians from Berlin
Jewish emigrants from Nazi Germany to the United Kingdom
Royal Pioneer Corps soldiers
British Army personnel of World War II
People interned in the Isle of Man during World War II
German classical cellists
British classical cellists
20th-century classical musicians
20th-century cellists